{{DISPLAYTITLE:C3H9O6P}}
The molecular formula C3H9O6P (molar mass: 172.07 g/mol, exact mass: 172.0137 u) may refer to:

 Glycerol 1-phosphate
 Glycerol 2-phosphate (BGP)
 Glycerol 3-phosphate

Molecular formulas